= Ancient vessel =

Ancient vessel may refer to:

- Amphora, an ancient crockery, a kind of vase
- Trireme, an ancient ship
